The year 1955 in television involved some significant events.
Below is a list of television-related events during 1955.

Events

January 10 – Minuto de Dios begins airing on television in Colombia; it will still be running more than 60 years later.
March 5 – Elvis Presley appears on television for the first time. The program is Louisiana Hayride, televised locally in Shreveport, Louisiana.
March 12 – The first Flemish children's TV show, Kom Toch Eens Kijken, is broadcast, hosted by Bob Davidse (Nonkel Bob) and Terry Van Ginderen (Tante Terry).
March 15 – The play No Time for Sergeants is broadcast by the American Broadcasting Company in The United States Steel Hour series, starring Andy Griffith in his television debut.
April 1 – The DuMont Television Network in the United States drastically decreases its programming; just eight series keep the network operating, in anticipation of its eventual shutdown sixteen months later.
May 9 – In the United States:
 Harpo Marx makes a memorable appearance on I Love Lucy.
 Jim Henson's puppet show Sam and Friends first airs on WRC-TV in Washington, D.C.
May 10 – The first episode of the long-running and popular Flemish TV sitcom Schipper naast Mathilde is broadcast.  
June 7 – The quiz show craze begins with the premiere of The 64,000 Dollar Question in the U.S. The series spawns many imitations, including Twenty-One the next year, which will later be the focus of a quiz show scandal that results in congressional hearings.
June 24 – Channel 4 Bang Khum Phron is launched by Thai Thorathat (Thai Television, predecessor of MCOT HD), the first official television station in Thailand. 
June 29 – Life with the Lyons, one of the first successful British sitcoms (starring British-domiciled American couple Ben Lyon and Bebe Daniels), premieres on the BBC Television Service, having previously been broadcast only on radio. It will later transfer to ITV.
July 19 – Eesti Televisioon begins broadcasting from Tallinn in the Estonian Soviet Socialist Republic.
August 1 – Austrian ORF Television, predecessor of ORF eins, an officially regular broadcasting service, starts in Vienna.
September 22 – Commercial television starts in the United Kingdom with the Independent Television Authority's first ITV franchise beginning broadcasting in London – Associated-Rediffusion on weekdays, ATV during weekends, ending the previous BBC monopoly. The rest of the UK receives its regional ITV franchises during the next seven years. The first advertisement shown is for Gibbs SR toothpaste.
September 28 – World Series baseball is broadcast in color for the first time in the U.S. WITN-TV in Washington, North Carolina, signs on the air with game 1 of the 1955 World Series as their first telecast.
December 10 – The first Saturday morning cartoon series debuts on U.S. television, The Mighty Mouse Playhouse on CBS.
December 24 – The Lennon Sisters make their television debut on The Lawrence Welk Show on ABC in the U.S.
December 25 – After being broadcast by radio since 1932, the Royal Christmas Message is broadcast on British television for the first time, in sound only at 3.00pm on both television channels, live from Sandringham House. The first visual Christmas message is shown in 1957.

Programs/programmes
Adventures of Superman (1952–1958)
American Bandstand (1952–1989)
Annie Oakley (1954–1957)
Aubrey and Gus (1955–1956)
Beau temps, mauvais temps (1955–1958)
Bim Bam Boom (1955–1956)
Bozo the Clown (1949–present)
Candid Camera (1948–present)
Cap-aux-sorciers (1955–1958)
Cisco Kid (1950–1956)
Climax! (1954–1958)
Come Dancing (UK) (1949–1995)
Country Canada (1955–2007)
Cross-Canada Hit Parade (1955–1960)
Death Valley Days (1952–1975)
Disneyland (1954–1958)
Dragnet (1951–1959)
Face the Nation (1954–present)
Father Knows Best (1954-1960)
General Motors Theatre (Can) (1953–1956, 1958–1961)
Gillette Cavalcade of Sports (1946–1960)
Hallmark Hall of Fame (1951–present)
Hockey Night in Canada (1952–present)
Howdy Doody (1947–1960)
I Love Lucy (1951–1960)
Junior Magazine (1955–1962)
Kraft Television Theater (1947–1958)
Kukla, Fran and Ollie (1947–1957)
Life is Worth Living (1952–1957)
Love of Life (1951–1980)
Maggie Muggins (1955–1962)
Meet the Press (1947–present)
Musical Chairs (1955) – game show hosted by Bill Leyden
Our Miss Brooks  (1952-1956)
Panorama (UK) (1953–present)
Search for Tomorrow (1951–1986)
Sergeant Preston of the Yukon (1955-1958)
Talent Varieties (1955) – country music variety show
The Adventures of Ozzie and Harriet (1952–1966)
The Brighter Day (1954–1962)
The Colgate Comedy Hour (1950-1955)
The Danny Thomas Show (1953-1964)
The Ed Sullivan Show (1948–1971)
The George Burns and Gracie Allen Show (1950–1958)
The Goldbergs (1949–1956)
The Good Old Days (UK) (1953–1983)
The Grove Family (UK) (1954–1957)
The Guiding Light (1952–present)
The Jack Benny Program (1950–1965)
The Jimmy Durante Show (1954–1956)
The Milton Berle Show (1954–1967)
The Roy Rogers Show (1951–1957)
The Secret Storm (1954–1974)
The Today Show (1952–present)
The Tonight Show (1954–present)
The Voice of Firestone (1949–1963)
This Is Your Life (US) (1952–1961)
Truth or Consequences (1950–1988)
What's My Line (1950–1967)
Your Hit Parade (1950–1959)
Zoo Quest (UK) (1954–1964)

Debuts
January 2 – The Bob Cummings Show (also known as Love That Bob) on NBC (1955–1959)
January 3 - Hollywood Today on NBC (1955)
January 5 – Norby on NBC (1955), first regular weekly series broadcast by NBC in its new all-electronic compatible color system
January 15 – The Benny Hill Show (UK) on BBC Television (later moving to ITV; 1955–1989)
January 22 – Ozark Jubilee, the first popular country music series on American network television, on ABC (1955–1960), featuring Red Foley
April 9 - Science Fiction Theater also known as Beyond the Limits during syndication in the 1960s. (1955-1957)
May 9 - Jim Henson's First Muppet Series: Sam and Friends  on WRC-TV (1955-1961)
June 25 – The Soldiers, an 11-episode live military comedy, aired on NBC through September 3.
June 28 – Talent Varieties on ABC through November 1
June 29 – Life With The Lyons (UK), one of the first successful British sitcoms (though starring an American, Ben Lyon), on BBC Television (1955–1960)
July 2 – The Lawrence Welk Show on ABC (1955–1982)
July 9 – Dixon of Dock Green (UK) on BBC Television (1955–1976)
July 20 – Frankie Laine Time on CBS (1955–1956)
July 29 – This Is Your Life (UK) on BBC Television (1955–2003)
September 10 
 Gunsmoke on CBS (1955–1975)
 It's Always Jan, starring Janis Paige, on CBS (1955–1956)
September 12 – Medical Horizons on ABC (1955–1956)
September 20
 Cheyenne on ABC (1955–1962)
 Joe and Mabel on CBS (1955-1956)
September 26 – Jungle Jim in syndication (1955–1956)
September 28 – Brave Eagle on CBS (1955–1956)
September 29 - Sergeant Preston of the Yukon on CBS (1955-1958)
October 1 – The Honeymooners on CBS, starring Jackie Gleason (1955–1956)
October 2 –  Alfred Hitchcock Presents on CBS (1955–1962)
October 3 
 Captain Kangaroo on CBS (1955–1984)
 Mickey Mouse Club on ABC, featuring "Mouseketeer" Annette Funicello (1955–1959)
October 20 – Wanted, a crime documentary on CBS (only ran for three months) (1955–1956)
October 22 – Quatermass II (UK), sequel to 1953's The Quatermass Experiment, on BBC Television (ends on November 26)
October 31 – Matinee Theatre on NBC, a five-days-a-week live dramatic anthology, with most of the plays in the series broadcast in color (lasted until 1958)

Programs ending

Births

References

External link

1955 in television